The Alabama Policy Institute (API) is a nonprofit, conservative think tank located in Alabama. According to the organization's mission statement, it is "dedicated to influencing public policy in the interest of the preservation of free markets, limited government and strong families." API is headquartered in Birmingham, Alabama.

History
The Alabama Policy Institute was founded in 1989 as the Alabama Family Alliance. Alabama Supreme Court justice Tom Parker was the founding executive director. Gary Palmer, a co-founder of the Alabama Family Alliance, eventually became its president. In 2000, the Alabama Family Alliance was renamed the Alabama Policy Institute. 

After 25 years at the helm, Palmer stepped down from his role as the institute's president in order to successfully run Alabama's 6th congressional district in 2014. He was replaced by Caleb Crosby, who had served as API's vice president and CFO prior to becoming the group's president in September 2014. In September 2019 it was announced that Alabama Governor Kay Ivey's former communications director Josh Pendergrass had been named API's chief communications officer. On January 25, 2023, Stephanie Smith succeeded Caleb Crosby as API's third President and CEO. Her professional experience includes serving as Director of Governmental Affairs for Regions Financial, President of the Opelika Chamber of Commerce, Assistant Director of Finance for the State of Alabama, Deputy Director of Finance for the State of Alabama, and as Principal of the Thatcher Coalition.

Policy positions
API researches policy issues and offers analysis and proposals through reports and publications to public servants, citizens, and the media. As a conservative think tank, API addresses a range of policy issues in the areas of economics, education, the environment, government, family and society.

API has argued for what they consider to be fairer taxes in Alabama. In 2003, API was a staunch opponent of Republican Governor Bob Riley's $1.2 billion tax increase proposal. It commissioned a study by the Beacon Hill Institute about Riley's tax increase legislation. API has been a critic of proposals for an Alabama state lottery, labeling such proposals a regressive tax on the poor.

API has championed charter schools in Alabama. It strongly supports the Alabama Accountability Act, which expanded school choice and school vouchers in the state. API was a proponent of both the Marriage Act, passed in 1998, and Alabama Amendment 774, which was approved by 81% of Alabama voters in 2006.

In 2014, API released a report titled Alabama's Environment 2014: Six Critical Indicators. It covered energy, air quality, water quality, forests and land, toxic release inventory and climate change. It provided a positive outlook on the state of the environment, arguing that the nation's air quality and the environment in general are improving.

In February 2015, the Alabama Policy Institute and the Alabama Citizens Action Program filed a lawsuit asking the Alabama Supreme Court to halt same-sex marriages in the state until the United States Supreme Court addresses the issue.

References

External links
 Official website
 Organizational Profile – National Center for Charitable Statistics (Urban Institute)

Organizations established in 1989
1989 establishments in Alabama
Political and economic think tanks in the United States
Conservative organizations in the United States
Organizations based in Birmingham, Alabama
Conservative political advocacy groups in the United States